Bangka Belitung United FC (commonly abbreviated as Babel United) was an Indonesian football club based in Pangkal Pinang, Bangka-Belitung Islands, Indonesia. The club played their home games at Depati Amir Stadium.

History 
Babel United was formed on 2019 after Aceh United and PS Timah Babel merged.

Players

References

External links
Liga-Indonesia.co.id

Football clubs in Indonesia
Association football clubs established in 2019
Association football clubs disestablished in 2020
2019 establishments in Indonesia
Defunct football clubs in Indonesia